Bazneshin-e Sofla (also Romanized as Bāzneshīn-e Soflá; also known as Bāzneshīn-e Pā’īn) is a village in Rahimabad Rural District, Rahimabad District, Rudsar County, Gilan Province, Iran. At the 2006 census, its population was 804, in 216 families.

References 

Populated places in Rudsar County